JAGO is the only crewed German research submersible. The submersible and the crew K. Hissmann and the pilot J. Schauer are based  at the GEOMAR Helmholtz Centre for Ocean Research Kiel since 1 January 2006. The former owner was zoologist Hans Fricke from the Max Planck Institute for Behavioral Physiology in Seewiesen, Bavaria. It can sample organisms, rock, gas and liquids, and can be used as a rescue and recovery vehicle for the northern Baltic Sea area. Due to the multidisciplinary connection between the GEOMAR and the Christian-Albrechts-Universität zu Kiel, scientists from the Cluster of Excellence "The Future Ocean" have occasional access to the submersible.

In 2011 JAGO undertook a search to find and inspect Nautilus, one of the first submarines adapted for research.

Technical specifications

References

External links
 Website GEOMAR: JAGO
 Website Cluster of Excellence "The Future Ocean"

Research submarines of Germany
Research vessels of Germany